Nélida Piñon (3 May 1937 – 17 December 2022) was a Brazilian author and professor. At the time of her death, Piñon was "considered among the foremost writers in Brazil today".

Life
Nélida Cuiñas Piñon was born in 1937 in the middle class Vila Isabel area of Rio de Janeiro to Olivia Carmen Cuíñas Piñón, a homemaker and Lino Piñón Muíños, a merchant. Her mother was the child of Galician immigrants, her father a first generation Galician immigrant.

She studied at the Catholic University of Rio de Janeiro before working as a journalist for the newspaper O Globo and the magazine Cadernos Brasileiros. She has taught writing in workshops and at institutions including Columbia University, Johns Hopkins and the University of Miami, where she has been the Stanford Professor of Humanities.

Her first novel was Guia-Mapa de Gabriel Arcanjo (The Guidebook of Archangel Gabriel), written in 1961, it concerns a protagonist discussing Christian doctrine with her guardian angel. In the 1970s, she became noted for erotic novels A casa de paixão (The House of Passion) and A força do destino (The Force of Destiny), written in 1977.

In 1984, she had her perhaps greatest success with A República dos Sonhos, (The Republic of Dreams). The work involves generations of a family from Galicia who emigrated to Brazil, which relates to her own family's experience.

Among other distinctions, Piñon was awarded the 1995 FIL Award and the 2005 Prince of Asturias Award for literature. She also was the President of Academia Brasileira de Letras (Brazilian Academy of Letters) from 1996 to 1997, and occupied the José Bonifácio Chair of Iberoamerican Affairs of the University of São Paulo in 2015. She received the Spanish citizenship in 2021 by the Royal Decree.

Piñon died on 17 December 2022, at the age of 85, in Lisbon.

Books

 Guia-Mapa de Gabriel Arcanjo (The Guidebook of Gabriel Arcanjo) (1961)
 Fundador (Founders) (pre-1971) 
 A Casa da Paixão (The House of Passion) (1972)
 A força do destino (The Force of Destiny) (1977)
 The Republic of Dreams, tr. Helen Lane, University of Texas Press (1991), 
 A doce canção de Caetana (The Sweet Song of Caetana) (1987)
 Vozes do Deserto (2006)
 Coração Andarilho (2009)
 O Livro das Horas (2012)
 Filhos da América (2016)
 Uma Furtiva Lágrima (2019)
 Um dia Chegarei a Sagres (2020)

Short stories
 I love my husband.
 Big-Bellied Cow
 O Pão de Cada Dia

Awards
 Walmap Prize, 1970, for her historical novel, 'Fundador' (Founders)
 Mario de Andrade Prize, 1973, from the Association of Arts Critics in São Paulo for her novel, "A casa de paixão"
 Brazilian Writers’ Union Prize, 1987
 FIL Award, 1995.
 Menéndez Pelayo International Prize, 2003
 Puterbaugh Conference on World Literature honoree, 2004
 Prince of Asturias Award, 2005

References

Further reading 
 Camargo Namorato, Luciana, et al. "Special Section: Nélida Piñón." World Literature Today, 79.1, April 2005: 7-28. .
 Piñon, Nélida, and Archive Of Hispanic Literature On Tape. 1979. Audio. Retrieved from the Library of Congress. https://www.loc.gov/item/93842452/
 Piñon, Nélida, 'The Myth of Creation'. In Lives on the Line: The Testimony of Contemporary Latin American Authors, Berkeley: University of California, 1988, pp. 198–204.
 Pontiero, Giovanni, 'Notes on the Fiction of Nelida Piñon', Review (Center for Inter-american Relations), Vol. 17, 1976, pp. 67–71.

External links
Culturebase.net
Nélida Piñón recorded in Rio de Janeiro for the Archive of Literature of the Hispanic Division at the Library of Congress on November 26, 1999.

1937 births
2022 deaths
Writers from Rio de Janeiro (city)
Members of the Brazilian Academy of Letters
Members of the Royal Spanish Academy
Members of the Mexican Academy of Language
Brazilian women novelists
Brazilian short story writers
20th-century Brazilian novelists
20th-century Brazilian women writers
Brazilian people of Spanish descent
Recipients of the Order of Cultural Merit (Brazil)
People from Rio de Janeiro (city)
Brazilian people of Galician descent